Araneta City (stylized in all lowercase), formerly and still commonly known as Araneta Center, is a  transit oriented, commercial mixed-use development in Quezon City, Philippines. Situated in Barangay Socorro in Cubao, and at the intersection of two major roads, Epifanio de los Santos Avenue (EDSA) and Aurora Boulevard, the area offers retail, dining, entertainment, residential, office, lodging and parking facilities throughout the complex and hosts over 1 million people daily, due to its close proximity to transport terminals, including the railway stations of the MRT Line 3 and the LRT Line 2.

Located within the complex are key structures such as the Gateway Mall, the Araneta Coliseum, the New Frontier Theater, Ali Mall, Farmers Market, and Farmers Plaza. The entire complex is owned by ACI, Inc., a subsidiary of the Araneta Group, who also serves as the developer and manager of the commercial area. ACI, Inc. is also currently in charge of spearheading a redevelopment master plan after years of delays and issues, which aims to transform the area into a "garden city" and consists of additional buildings, shopping malls, and other high-rise facilities within the complex, set to be completed within 2030.

Early History

The  property where the Araneta City, formerly named Araneta Center, is located in Quezon City, and was purchased by J. Amado Araneta in 1952, after the family's mansion in Taft Avenue, Manila was destroyed during the Battle of Manila in 1945. The land stood on bedrock, and has an elevation level of 43 meters, which is the highest point of the Metro Manila, located between Highway 54 (now Epifanio de los Santos Avenue), Aurora Boulevard, and P. Tuazon Boulevard; and along Gen. Romulo Avenue. As of 1959, the area was remote and located in an area designated for suburban mass housing and frequented by Hukbalahap rebels. The original owner of the property was the Radio Corporation of America (RCA).

In 1953, Araneta initially only purchased  of land from RCA, where he built his residence, which would become known as the "Bahay na Puti" (White House). It was in 1955 that Araneta purchased the remaining  from the RCA.

In 1956, Araneta sold a portion of the property to the Philippine National Bank which proceeded to set up a branch in the area. On the same year, the first Aguinaldo Department Store, a well-known retailer established its first branch beyond Manila. Araneta's Progressive Development Corporation (PDC) relocated its offices from Plaza Cervantes in Binondo, Manila to the Araneta Enterprise Building along Aurora Avenue. PDC would be later tasked to develop the Araneta Coliseum.

In the following years after the opening of the Araneta Coliseum in 1960, rapid development took place in the area. From the 1960s until the 1980s, there was a construction boom around the complex, and the area became a bustling entertainment and leisure hub, with the creation of the first strip mall in the country composed of 147 stores, located along Aurora Boulevard, and the creation of Ali Mall, SM Cubao, Fiesta Carnival (now the site of Shopwise hypermarket), Plaza Fair, New Frontier Theater, Rustan's Superstore, National Book Store Superbranch, COD Department Store, Matsuzakaya Department Store and Matsuzakaya House, Uniwide Cubao, Farmers Plaza, Farmer's Market, and the Aurora Tower. The developments around the complex caused the area to prosper over the years and competed with other business districts in the Metro, such as Manila, the Makati Central Business District, the Greenhills Center, and the Ortigas Center.

The Araneta City and the surrounding areas also served as the home of many movie theaters such as the Nation Cinerama, Quezon Theater, Cinema 21, Sampaguita Theater, ACT Theater, Ocean Theater, Diamond Theater, Remar Theater, Alta Cinema, and Coronet Theater. Many of these establishments however have been closed by the end of the 1990s, with the buildings either repurposed for commercial purposes or demolished to give way to future developments due to the introduction of the home entertainment system and the creation of in-house movie theaters inside the shopping malls in the Metro that led to lesser patronage to these movie theaters.

It was during the late 1980s where the complex began losing steam and encountered numerous problems within its properties, from the Farmers Plaza fire to the coups against the Presidency of Corazon Aquino and even during the aftermath of the 1997 Asian financial crisis.  The Araneta Group also faced numerous uncertainties and rising competition from newer mixed-use developments with more advantageous locations within Manila and Ninoy Aquino International Airport. The following problems created an urban decay within the area, a capital slump within the Araneta Group's finances, and neglecting their buildings, causing rising crime rates and low business opportunities, prompting the Araneta group to temporarily use their capital to maintain the properties within the area, and halt their future plans and proposals to upgrade the area's potential and other big-scale redevelopment plans within the area. One noted planned development is the "Manhattan Tower" project, a mixed-use, high-rise development with retail and residential facilities. The problem also caused the Araneta Group to strengthen its key subsidiaries to finance the company's future projects.

Redevelopment
During the construction of the MRT Line 3 along Epifanio de los Santos Avenue (EDSA) in 1996, the Araneta Group saw the potential opportunity to revamp the complex and proposed plans to once again begin its redevelopment plans and push the company's plans for long-term development. The redevelopment dream was further titillated in the aftermath of the construction of the LRT Line 2 a year later, and prompted J. Amado's son, Jorge L. Araneta to launch a multi-phase master plan to reinvigorate their long-waited vision. With the ambition of regaining its former glory, a 20-year redevelopment project, known as the Araneta Center Master Plan, was formulated in 1999 and was unveiled in 2000, with an estimated budget of over ₱80 billion ($1.62 billion), and began in 1999 with the renovation of the Araneta Coliseum. The redevelopment master plan is envisioned to turn the complex into an inter-connected, transit oriented "Garden City" concept, promoting connectivity, green architecture and open spaces within its buildings. Araneta also hired the international architectural firm RTKL Associates, along with local architectural firms Palafox Associates, owned by Felino Palafox, ASYA Design, and Aidea, for the redevelopment master plan. Araneta also tapped Deshazo Starek and Tang (now Deshazo Group), Jones Lang LaSalle Incorporated and Colliers International to serve as the main consultants of the master plan. The plans for the master plan include additional malls, towers and renovated facilities within the complex, including the "Millenium Mall" project, a planned 7-storey mall which is interconnected to the Araneta Coliseum, the "Manila Tower", a  planned mixed-use tower with communications facilities, and a modernization of the complex's entertainment venues, the Araneta Coliseum and the New Frontier Theater.

The first phase of the redevelopment plan, totaling over ₱30 billion ($608 million) began in 2002 with the construction of the Gateway Mall, completed in 2004, and a major renovation of the Araneta Coliseum as well as the rehabilitation of the New Frontier Theater, which were completed in 2014 and 2015, respectively. Also included in the redevelopment project is the renovations of Ali Mall and SM Cubao in 2010, Shopwise in 2012, and the Farmers Plaza in 2014, as well as the construction of the first 12 towers of the Manhattan Gardens complex,  the Gateway Tower, the Novotel Manila Araneta City, and the Araneta City Cyberpark Towers 1 and 2. The completion of the first phase is set within 2023–2024, with the completion of the Manhattan Plaza Tower 2 and opening of the upcoming Gateway Mall 2 and Ibis Styles Araneta City.

The second phase, totaling over ₱50 billion ($1.01 billion) is set to begin in the next few years, and will include the development of 3 additional Cyberpark Towers, 6 additional Manhattan Gardens Towers, and the Gateway Mall 3. The phase will also include the construction of the City Plaza, a  Mixed-use development, and the Icon Tower, a planned 40+ storey tower, connected from the Manhattan Plaza. The master plan will also include a multi-billion dollar  Integrated resort consisting hotels, dining, entertainment, gaming, conventions and conferences, luxurious retail shops, a modernised Farmer's Market, and a heritage area located along EDSA, spanning from the Farmer's Market and its surrounding buildings, up to the Farmer's Garden area; and a planned expansion of Ali Mall, which includes a 4-tower mixed-use development located along the northern area of the mall. The overall redevelopment master-plan covers  square meters of gross floor area and are set within the target completion date of 2030, as part of the company's Vision 2030 plan within the area. On September 24, 2019, the Araneta Center was renamed as Araneta City after a brand relaunch.

Facilities and tenants

Shopping and Leisure

Gateway Mall

The Gateway Mall is a 6-storey mall located within General Aguinaldo Avenue and serves as the complex's flagship mall. The mall has  of floor area and houses local and international brands such as Rustan's, H&M, Uniqlo, Automatic Centre Digital Plaza, and various lifestyle shops, tech shops, food kiosks, and restaurants. The mall was designed by RTKL Associates in partnership with Felino Palafox of Palafox Associates and received various acclaims of different organizations, as the mall was named the shopping mall as the Shopping Center of the Year for two consecutive years in 2006 and 2007 by the Philippine Retailers Association, a Merit Awardee at the International Council of Shopping Centers (ICSC) 30th Innovative Design and Development Awards, and a finalist at the 2008 Urban Land Institute Awards for Excellence.

The mall will soon include the Gateway Mall 2, an upcoming 8-storey expansion of the Gateway Mall, and will have  of total floor area, and will also feature over 400 retail shops, 100 restaurants, an atrium, a "European Market" inspired Gourmet Hall, an island restaurant-themed food court, a 8-cinema cineplex, a sensory and culinary garden, a "Papal Hat" inspired 1,000-seater chapel. The new expansion of the mall is set to open within February 2023.

Ali Mall

The Ali Mall is a 4-storey mall located within the corner lot of P. Tuazon Boulevard, and General Romulo Avenue, Ali Mall served as the first integrated mall in the country, following its opening in 1976. Named after Muhammad Ali in the aftermath of his fight against Joe Frazier in the Thrilla in Manila, held at the Araneta Coliseum. The mall has  of floor area and is occupied by local shops, restaurants, and government facilities.

Farmers Plaza

The Farmers Plaza is a 5-storey mall located along EDSA. Completed in 1969, the mall served as the first mall in the country and formerly house the Farmers Market until 1976.

Farmers Market

The Farmers Market is a wet market located adjacent to the Farmers Plaza. Opened in 1976 after occupying the basement area of the Farmers Plaza, the market has  of market space and offers fresh produces in the country.

National Bookstore Superbranch
The National Book Store Superbranch in Cubao, which is also known as the National Book Store Outlet Store, serves as one of the largest branches of the office-supplies store chain in the Philippines. The bookstore first became a single-floor building in 1972, before being upgraded into a 9-storey building in 1982, designed by Rogelio Garcia Villarosa. The bookstore branch also serves as one of the primary warehouses of books within Metro Manila, and for the company's online shopping operations.

Shopwise Hypermarket
The supermarket is also set to move to the basement section of the upcoming Gateway Mall 2, while the building will be demolished and upgraded as the City Plaza, a  upcoming Mixed-use development.

SM Araneta City
The SM Araneta City, formerly named SM Cubao, is a mall located along P. Tuazon Boulevard and serves as one of the first shopping centers by SM Retail. Groundbreaking for the construction of the mall began in October 1978, and was completed in 1980. The building also entered renovation on June 2009 and was completed in January 2010, which featured a modernized facade design pattered with stripes within the grey and white colored exteriors, upgraded interiors such as the upgraded atriums with a "shower-like" LED lights display and a striped interior design, expanded floor space, and a skybridge along Times Square Avenue, linking the building to Ali Mall. Another skybridge was unveiled in February 2019, which is directly connected to the Cyberpark Tower One, located along General Aguinaldo Avenue. On 3 October 2022, the building was renamed as SM Araneta City, after an agreement was made between the Araneta Group and SM Retail to rename the building.

Other Shops and Leisure Spaces
The complex also contains numerous al fresco dining areas, vintage shops, and plant and gardening shops catering its clientele, such as the Araneta City Expo, the Cubao Expo, the Farmers Garden, and the Manhattan Row, wherein the area also serves as an alternative outdoor concert venue. On 3 June 2022, the Araneta City Foodpark, which is also known as the Times Square Food Park, was repurposed in partnership with S&T Leisure Worldwide and became the Araneta Fiesta Park, offering outdoor rides, attractions and outdoor dining spaces. On November 11, Araneta City revives the iconic Christmas On Display (COD), mounted inside the Carnival, while on November 18, the Araneta Fiesta Park rebrands as Mini Fiesta Carnival.

Events Venues and Parking Spaces

The Araneta City is also host of some of Metro Manila's major event venues, such as the Smart Araneta Coliseum and the New Frontier Theater. The city also offers 7,000 parking spaces, including parking spaces from the Araneta City Parking Garage South, a green parking building completed in August 2012, which is equipped with systems that decreases carbon emissions in the atmosphere, located at the southern part of the Smart Araneta Coliseum. The parking building is capable of storing over 1,500 vehicles.

Smart Araneta Coliseum
Often known as the "Big Dome", the Smart Araneta Coliseum is an indoor arena located along General Aguinaldo Avenue. Construction for the coliseum began in 1957, before being completed in 1960, and hosted numerous events since its opening, ranging from various concerts, sports matches, gatherings, and entertainment purposes. In the aftermath of the Araneta Center redevelopment plan, plans were also laid out to demolish the Araneta Coliseum in 1999, due to high maintenance costs and amusement taxes. These problems gained little to no revenue in the part of the Araneta Group, despite being subsidized by the government. After further discussions and planning, Jorge Araneta decided to retain and preserve the Coliseum, due to its historical significance and its potential to cater more events in the near future. The coliseum serves as the primary events venue for local media firms and for sports-related events.

New Frontier Theater
The New Frontier Theater is a 2,385-seater multi-purpose events hall, which was the largest theater in the Philippines when it opened in 1967. The theater is currently used as an alternative to the Smart Araneta Coliseum for small scale concerts and meet up gatherings.

Hotels

The complex currently houses five hotels, wherein two of the hotels are owned by Araneta Hotels Inc., in partnership with Accor Hotels. One of these hotels is the Novotel Manila Araneta City, which opened its doors in 2015. The Araneta Group is also set to open its second hotel in the area in 2023, with the opening of the Ibis Styles Araneta City. Meanwhile, three hotels in the area are owned by different companies, such as Cheers Hotel, located along EDSA, Hotel Dreamworld, which is formerly occupied by Eurotel, and Eurotel, which occupies the first seven floors of the Vivaldi Residences Cubao, serve as the budget hotel component within the complex.

Novotel Manila Araneta City

The Novotel Manila Araneta City is a 24-storey, mid-scale hotel located at the southeast corner to the Araneta Coliseum, and serves as the first Novotel hotel in the country. The hotel has a total of 401 rooms and features 5 restaurants, 7 meeting & function rooms, a spa room, a play area, an open-air events space, a Premium Lounge and a penthouse at the topmost floor.

Ibis Styles Araneta City

The Ibis Styles Araneta City is an upcoming budget hotel located adjacent to the Gateway Mall 2, along General Roxas Avenue . The new hotel is currently topped off, and will feature 286 rooms and features six function rooms, a lobby lounge, an all-day dining restaurant and patisserie, and a rooftop pool bar with a cantilevered pool, and is expected to open its doors within early 2023.

Office Towers and commercial buildings

Aurora Tower
The Aurora Tower is a 22-storey, mixed-use tower comprising of retail, office, penthouse spaces and a rooftop helipad, with Isetann Department Store and Supermarket occupying its first 7 floors. The tower has  of total space and was completed in 1984. The tower also serves as the former headquarters of the Araneta Group and currently houses local companies, and the offices of the Honorary Consulate of Colombia as tenants occupy the upper levels of the building.

Gateway Tower

The Gateway Tower is a 31-storey mixed-use tower directly connected to the Gateway Mall. Completed in 2014, the tower serves as the headquarters of the Araneta Group and other Business Process Outsourcing (BPO) companies. The tower also comprises retail spaces, more commonly known as the Gateway Tower Mall, corporate office spaces, which are currently occupied by the Araneta Group, 3 penthouse levels, and a helipad.

Araneta City Cyberpark

The Araneta City Cyberpark is a  office development complex located within the city's southern cluster and serves as the office and information technology (IT) Hub components of the area, and houses both international and local companies, primarily Business Process Outsourcing (BPO) companies. The complex currently comprises two towers, namely Cyberpark Tower 1 and Tower 2, which are completed in 2016 and 2019, respectively. One tower, Cyberpark Tower 3, is currently being constructed, and will be similarly designed to its predecessor, the Cyberpark Tower 2. The upcoming tower is aimed to be completed in the 1st quarter of 2025.

Other commercial buildings
The Araneta City is also home to other commercial buildings within the area, wherein some of the buildings served as movie theaters repurposed into various purposes, or newly built buildings within the 2000s. These buildings are presently occupied by Puregold, Rex Bookstore, Savemore Market, the Philippine American Life and General Insurance Company, and other local firms.

Residential

Manhattan Gardens
The Manhattan Gardens is a 4-phase (Parkway, Parkview, Heights, Plaza) condominium complex, serving as the first transit-oriented residential development in the country, and occupies  hectares of the Araneta City. The development project will have a total condominium units of 9,000 units spread out through 18 residential towers upon completion. At present, the Manhattan Gardens currently has 10 towers in completion, with 1 tower topped-off, which is set to be completed in 2023, and is now set to construct 7 more condominiums on the pipleline within the former Rustan's Superstore and the present Araneta City Bus Station.

Vivaldi Residences Cubao

Another residential project within the complex is the Vivaldi Residences Cubao, a 40-storey mixed-use tower, located along the northwestern side of the complex, and along the corners of EDSA and Aurora Boulevard. The tower began construction in 2011, before being completed in 2016, and houses Eurotel on its first seven floors.

Mixed-use Development

Gateway Square
The Gateway Square is a  mixed-use superblock development located in the central part of the Araneta City. The mixed-use area is the first of its kind in the country and is connected to other buildings and developments via sky bridges and walk paths. The development is set to be completed within 2023, after the opening of the Gateway Mall 2 and the Ibis Styles Hotel.

City Plaza
Set to be built within the Shopwise Supermarket, the City Plaza is a  mixed-use development comprising of 5 towers with approximately 60 storeys skyward or higher for each tower. The City Plaza will also feature a 4-star hotel, premium grade offices, luxury residential towers, leisure and retail spaces, and green amenities such as the "Spanish Steps", and the civic center.

Araneta Mansion
The Araneta Mansion, also known as the White House, and is often translated as the Bahay Na Puti, is also located within the Araneta City, occupying the southwest corner of the city located along the corner of P. Tuazon Boulevard and Epifanio de los Santos Avenue, and serves as the official residence of the Araneta family. The mansion hosted many local and foreign guests, such as Muhammad Ali, Then-Colombian President Juan Manuel Santos and First Lady María Clemencia Rodríguez Múnera, Andrew Tan, Nat King Cole, Johnny Mathis, Paul Anka, Neil Sedaka, Julio Iglesias, among many others, and also features approximately 300 chicken dens on the mansion's western side for cockfighting and fowl breeding purposes.

Transportation

There are two elevated rail stations serving the area; the MRT Line 3 and the LRT Line 2 Araneta Center-Cubao stations. The area also serves as a terminal for jeepneys, BEEP Jeepneys, and UV Express vehicles serving the nearby areas of Quezon City, Marikina, the Province of Rizal (namely Antipolo, Cainta, San Mateo, Montalban, Taytay, and Angono), Manila, Pasig, and San Juan. The city also caters two bus terminals, the Araneta City Bus Terminal and the Araneta City Busport, servicing passengers going to Central Luzon, Southern Luzon, the Bicol Region, the Visayas Provinces and the Mindanao Provinces. The area around the complex also serves as a transport terminal for other jeepneys and provincial buses serving nearby cities and provincial areas around the country.

Araneta also offers the UBE Express Premium Point-to-Point Airport Bus Service, which connects Araneta City to Manila International Airport and SM Mall of Asia, as well as a free E-shuttle services from Ali Mall, up to the Line 2 Araneta Center-Cubao Station-Gateway Mall Concourse. The free E-shuttle services began operations on June 20, 2009, and were temporarily suspended in the aftermath of the COVID-19 pandemic in the Philippines. The E-shuttle service were revived in November 2022.

On February 09, 2023, the older bus terminal would be razed down by fire, and has caused a ₱245 million damage, and has reignited a few hours later, before being fully watered down a few hours later.   The fire also temporarily delayed a PBA match between Terrafirma and Blackwater. The jeepneys servicing the terminal were temporarily located within Aurora Boulevard and P. Tuazon Boulevard. Two days later, on February 11, 2023, jeepney operations within the terminal were revived and once again have resumed operations.

References

External links 

 Official website

Mixed-use developments in Metro Manila
Planned communities in the Philippines
Shopping districts and streets in Metro Manila
Buildings and structures in Quezon City
Tourist attractions in Quezon City